Brydioside is any one of several chemical compounds isolated from certain plants, notably Bryonia dioica.  They can be seen as derivatives of the triterpene hydrocarbon cucurbitane, more specifically from cucurbitacin Lor 23,24-dihydrocucurbitacin I.

They include
 Brydioside A from Bryonia dioica

References 

Phytochemicals